Glen Allen Currie (born July 18, 1958) is a Canadian retired professional ice hockey left winger.

Selected 38th overall by the Washington Capitals in the 1978 NHL Entry Draft, Currie also played for the Los Angeles Kings.

Currie is the nephew of former NHL hockey player Jimmy Peters Sr.

External links
 
 Profile at hockeydraftcentral.com

1958 births
Canadian ice hockey left wingers
Living people
Los Angeles Kings players
Washington Capitals draft picks
Washington Capitals players